Zachary Community School District (ZCSD), or Zachary Community School Board is a school district in Zachary, Louisiana, United States. In addition to Zachary it serves some unincorporated areas around it.

The Zachary Community School System was founded in 2002 and was formed from schools that had been located in the East Baton Rouge Parish School District.  The schools in this system are located within the City of Zachary; however, the school district boundaries include areas outside of the incorporated City of Zachary.
 
Since 2005, the school system has been recognized by the Louisiana Department of Education as the top system in Louisiana.

Elementary schools
 Zachary Early Learning Center (Pre-Kindergarten)
 Northwestern Elementary School (Kindergarten)
 Rollins Place Elementary School (Grade 1-2)
 Zachary Elementary School (Grade 3-4)
 Copper Mill Elementary School (Grade 5-6)

Secondary schools
 Northwestern Middle School
 Zachary High School
 Port Hudson Career Academy

References

External links

 Zachary Community School Board

School districts in Louisiana
Education in East Baton Rouge Parish, Louisiana
School districts established in 2002
2002 establishments in Louisiana